The 1989 All-Ireland Junior Hurling Championship was the 68th staging of the All-Ireland Junior Championship since its establishment by the Gaelic Athletic Association in 1912.

Kilkenny entered the championship as the defending champions.

The All-Ireland final was played on 21 July 1989 at the Gaelic Grounds in Limerick, between Tipperary and Galway, in what was their first meeting in a final since 1926. Tipperary won the match by 0-12 to 0-08 to claim their eighth championship title overall and a first title since 1953.

Results

All-Ireland Junior Hurling Championship

All-Ireland quarter-final

All-Ireland semi-finals

All-Ireland final

References

Junior
All-Ireland Junior Hurling Championship